The 2016–17 season was the 137th season of competitive association football in England.

National teams

England national football team

Results and fixtures

2016

2017

2018 FIFA World Cup qualification (UEFA) Group F

Managerial changes

England women's national football team

Results and fixtures

2016

2017

UEFA Women's Euro 2017 qualifying Group 7

UEFA competitions

UEFA Champions League

Play-off round

|}

Group stage

Group A

Group C

Group E

Group G

Knockout phase

Round of 16

|}

Quarter-finals

|}

UEFA Europa League

Qualifying rounds

Third qualifying round

|}

Play-off round

|}

Group stage

Group A

Group K

Knockout Phase

Round of 32

|}

Round of 16

|}

Quarter-finals

|}

Semi-finals

|}

Finals

UEFA Youth League

UEFA Women's Champions League

Knockout phase

Round of 32

|}

Round of 16

|}

Quarter-finals

|}

Semi-finals

|}

Men's Football

League season

Promotion and relegation

Premier League 

Antonio Conte enjoyed a successful start to life as Chelsea manager, winning the title in his first season at the club and earning a record number of league victories for a season, with only poor early form preventing them from also setting a new points total. Tottenham Hotspur shrugged off a disappointing Champions League campaign to push Chelsea close for the title, though they ultimately missed out – however, they ultimately finished with both the best attack and defence, with striker Harry Kane once again claiming the Golden Boot, whilst they ultimately went unbeaten at home during their final season at White Hart Lane. Manchester City improved on the previous season's finish by one place in Pep Guardiola's first season in charge, though ultimately ended the season trophyless, despite recording the third-best attack and reaching the semi-finals of the FA Cup. Liverpool made the Champions League for the first time in three years in Jürgen Klopp's first full season, though were prevented from finishing any higher than fourth by an inconsistent start to 2017, a consequence of both losing their £35 million signing Sadio Mané to international duty in January and February as well as suffering from several dropped points against bottom-half teams, in spite of going the season unbeaten against the rest of the top seven.

Despite winning seven of their final eight games, Arsenal finished in fifth place and failed to qualify for the Champions League for the first time since 1997, as fan pressure on both manager Arsène Wenger and share-owner Stan Kroenke grew. While they did win the FA Cup for the third time in four seasons, making Wenger the most successful manager in the competition's history, they endured yet another disastrous Champions League run, losing at the last-16 stage for a seventh successive year. Manchester United finished in sixth place, one place lower than the previous season, in José Mourinho's first season in charge with their failure to turn any one of their 15 draws into victories, though they did at least win the EFL Cup and won the Europa League final, winning the competition for the first time in their history and therefore securing a place in the Champions League. In only their second-ever top-flight season, AFC Bournemouth built on the success of the previous season as they secured a ninth-place finish and scored 55 goals, defying the critics who had tipped them to struggle from second-season syndrome. Much as Chelsea had the previous season, Leicester City made a poor defence of their title, despite having what turned out to be the best Champions League run of any English club this season by reaching the quarter-finals. With the club struggling, manager Claudio Ranieri was sacked in February and replaced by coach Craig Shakespeare, who steered the club to 12th place, still the lowest finish for a defending Premier League champion, but comfortably clear of relegation.

Crystal Palace had looked in serious danger of relegation early on, but a revival after Sam Allardyce took over saw them comfortably survive, securing a club-record fifth successive top-flight season in the process. Swansea City also looked dead and buried after early struggles under Francesco Guidolin and then a disastrous spell with Bob Bradley as manager, but were ultimately saved by a late improvement under Paul Clement's management. Burnley fared the best of the promoted clubs, with only atrocious away form preventing them finishing higher as they made their home-ground of Turf Moor one of the hardest places to get a point from – and secured a second successive top-flight season for the first time in 40 years. Watford, in their first successive top-flight campaign for 30 years, successfully ensured a third consecutive Premier League season – however, as a result of poor away form, a disastrous end to the season and several spells of indifferent form throughout the campaign, the Hornets were unable to really build on the previous season despite recording their first league victories over Manchester United and at Arsenal since the 1980s.

After several successive escapes from relegation, Sunderland's resilience finally collapsed and they dropped into the Championship after a decade, spending virtually the entire season rooted to the bottom of the table, as David Moyes being the first manager to spend a full season in charge of the Black Cats since 2011 ultimately amounted to nothing. Middlesbrough also struggled throughout their first top-flight season in eight years, with a poor end to the season, the weakest goalscoring record in the division and an inability to turn one of their 13 draws into victories ultimately dooming them. Hull City were the final relegated side, never quite recovering from a disastrous pre-season which saw manager Steve Bruce quit and next to no new players signed; despite encouraging early season form under Mike Phelan, a dismal run in the winter saw him sacked and replaced by Marco Silva, who steered the club to a much better second half of the season, but it ultimately proved to be a case of too little, too late.

Championship 

Newcastle United and Brighton & Hove Albion led the way for most of the season, and ultimately secured the two automatic promotion spots. Newcastle, as in their previous spell in the second tier, made an immediate return to the top-flight as champions despite a late scare with three games to go (and because of both Sunderland and Middlesbrough being relegated, it would be the first time since 1998 that the Magpies were the sole North-East team in the top-flight), while Brighton (ironically managed by Chris Hughton who steered Newcastle to promotion in their previous spell in the Championship) lost out on the title on the last day, after not winning any of their last 3 games – however, by this point, they had already earned promotion to the top-flight for only the second time in their history, and for the first time since 1983, after they narrowly missed out to Middlesbrough on goal difference on the final day of the previous season. Taking the final spot through the playoffs were Huddersfield Town, who won promotion to the top-flight for the first time in 45 years and in manager David Wagner's first full season in charge – whilst they did endure a poor end to the season and ultimately finished with a negative goal difference, the Terriers gradually eased their way through the play-off semi-final games against Sheffield Wednesday and then edged out Reading on penalties in the final at Wembley.

Leeds United managed a promotion challenge for the first time in six years and secured only their third finish in the top half of the Championship since being relegated from the Premier League in 2004, but poor runs of form either end of the season combined with an excellent late run by Fulham saw them fall short of the play-offs. Aston Villa's first season outside of the top-flight since 1988 proved to be turbulent as they changed managers after just eleven games – whilst they didn't look like relegation material, their failure to turn draws into wins also prevented them from making anything resembling a promotion challenge despite striker Jonathan Kodjia scoring 19 of their goals. Birmingham City's season surprised for all the wrong reasons, as they controversially sacked manager Gary Rowett in favour of Gianfranco Zola in December despite being only just outside the play-offs, only for their form to completely collapse in the second half of the season, leaving them needing a late improvement after Zola was replaced by Harry Redknapp and then a final-day win at Bristol City to stay up.

After two seasons flirting with relegation, Rotherham United finished bottom in what was a truly awful league campaign, getting through three managers by the end of November and recording the lowest second tier points total since 3 points for a win was introduced in 1981, with only a three match unbeaten run at the end of the season stopping them from conceding 100 goals. Wigan Athletic were immediately relegated back to League One, never quite getting back to grips with life in the Championship and ultimately being cost dear by a poor end to the season, as well as a failure to win home games between October and January. Blackburn Rovers filled the final relegation spot in a season marred by increasing fan protests aimed at the owners; while a late-season revival under Tony Mowbray meant they took survival to the last day, other results ultimately went against them and sent them down to the third tier for the first time since 1980; this also made them the first former Premier League champions to drop down into the third tier (Leicester City and Manchester City had both been in the third tier since the formation of the Premier League, but did not win the league until after their spells in the third tier). In their first ever season in the Championship, Burton Albion flirted with the drop on several occasions but ultimately pulled themselves away from the bottom three to ensure their first season in the second tier would not be their last.

League One

After five seasons of near-misses and playoff heartbreak, Sheffield United finally ended their exile from the Championship and returned to the second tier for the first time since 2011, going up as champions and breaking the 100-point mark in the process. Despite making a slow start, the Blades gradually surged up the table and into the top two, giving former player Chris Wilder promotion in his first season as the club's manager as well as his second successive promotion in a year. Taking second place in a battle that went to the final day, Bolton Wanderers secured promotion back to the Championship at the first opportunity and in manager Phil Parkinson's first season in charge, never once looking like falling out of the top six. Taking the final spot through the play-offs were Millwall who shrugged off losing in the final the previous year by scraping into the top six in their last few games and then edged past opponents Bradford City in the final at Wembley, returning to the second tier after two years.

Fleetwood Town enjoyed their best season in their history, earning an unlikely fourth place, missing out on automatic promotion on the final day before only just being edged out by Bradford City in the play-offs semi-finals. In their first ever season at this level, AFC Wimbledon surprised the critics with an early challenge for promotion – whilst several dropped points and a failure to win any of their last six games pushed them back down into mid-table and below rivals Milton Keynes Dons (who looked like suffering a second successive relegation before the arrival of Hearts manager Robbie Neilson helped push them away from the drop), the club were not once in danger of suffering an immediate relegation back to League Two and ensured their stay in the third tier would last beyond one season. Northampton Town's first season in League One since 2009 started strongly as they continued their impressive unbeaten run, but a sharp drop in form in the winter months pushed them into the relegation battle, before a late good run of form helped them move back up the table. For the second season in a row, John Sheridan returned to Oldham Athletic to mastermind the Latic's great escape from relegation, despite their miserable scoring record that saw them score less than all four relegated teams.

At the bottom of the table, Chesterfield's three-year stay in League One came to an end as their decline in form following the loss of manager Paul Cook to Portsmouth finally took its toll. Coventry City fared not much better as they hit rock-bottom and fell into the bottom tier of the Football League for the first time since 1959 and just 16 years after having been in the top-flight – even victory in the Football League Trophy and a late run of good results following the return of successful former manager Mark Robins proved to not be enough, as growing fan protests towards the owners left the Sky Blues facing a bleak future. Only two years after narrowly missing out on promotion to the Championship, Swindon Town fell into League Two for the first time since 2012 with several poor results proving costly, despite the surprise appointment of former Tottenham manager Tim Sherwood as director of football. Taking the final spot were Port Vale, who looked like shrugging off the loss of manager Rob Page to Northampton Town – however, a complete collapse in form around the winter period saw them slide into the relegation zone and they were relegated on the final day after drawing at Fleetwood, as it turned out a victory would have proved enough to save them.

League Two 

Having lost in the play-offs just the previous year, Portsmouth shrugged off the heartbreak and won promotion to League One for the first time since 2013 and their first promotion in 14 years – despite looking set for the play-offs once more, a late surge in form from January onwards helped propel them into the top 3, taking the title on the last day. Going up in second were Plymouth Argyle, who also shrugged off their play-off loss from the previous year and ensured their six-year exile from the third tier came to an end, only missing out on the title by goal difference. Doncaster Rovers took the last automatic spot, securing an immediate return to League One – they had ironically been the first club to be promoted, but a failure to win any of their last five games pushed them into third place. Taking the last place through the play-offs were Blackpool, who also secured an immediate return to League One by defeating Exeter City at Wembley, also giving the club their first promotion since 2010 after 3 relegations in 5 years.

Despite losing their manager to Shrewsbury Town and then dismissing his replacement after only five months, Grimsby Town's first season in the Football League for six years saw them never once threatened with relegation and they secured their Football League status comfortably. Crewe Alexandra endured a turbulent season both on and off the pitch, as their strong start petered out and they were sucked into the relegation fight, which led to the dismissal of manager Steve Davis, an act seen as overdue by the fans after months of protests against the owners and their refusal to sack him. However, following the appointment of former player David Artell as manager, the Railwaymen fought their way back up the table and finished comfortably clear of the bottom two.

At the bottom of the table, after 112 years in the Football League and just three years after narrowly missing out on promotion to the Championship, Leyton Orient finally hit rock-bottom and were relegated to the fifth tier in a season that saw them change managers five times and was marked by increasing fan protests against the club owners, one of which led to the end of their final home game being finished behind closed doors. Taking the final spot on the last day were Hartlepool United, who finally saw their 96-year stay in the Football League end in the worst possible way – they had looked safe at the turn of the year but a collapse in form as well as failing to better the result of the team above them in their last game ultimately cost them their status. Having spent much of the season adrift in the relegation spaces, a late surge in form saw Newport County narrowly fight their way to safety – with a last-minute goal from player Mark O'Brien against Notts County on the final day proving to be crucial.

National League Top Division 

Six years after suffering relegation from League Two, Lincoln City returned to the Football League in a season of unprecedented success and off-field tragedy – not only did they win promotion as champions, nearly breaking the 100-point mark in the process, but they became the first non-league team in over 100 years to reach the quarter-finals of the FA Cup, even securing victory at top-flight team Burnley along the way, honouring the sudden passing of former player and manager Graham Taylor in January in the best possible way. Going up through the playoffs were Forest Green Rovers, who avenged their loss in the playoff final the previous year by comfortably beating Tranmere Rovers at Wembley in manager Mark Cooper's first full season in charge – in the process of winning promotion, not only did the club secure their place in the Football League for the first time in their history but they also ensured that their hometown of Nailsworth became the smallest settlement to ever host a Football League club.

At the bottom of the table, North Ferriby United's first-ever season in the fifth tier ended in disaster as they finished last, undone by their inability to score and having the second worst defence. Southport fared little better as their run of seven successive seasons in the fifth tier finally came to an end in the worst possible fashion, conceding nearly 100 goals and making it through not just three managers but even losing their chairman along the way. Braintree Town took the third spot on the last day of the season, only one season after finishing third in the table and losing out to eventually-promoted Grimsby Town over two legs – just one win from their final three games would have saved them from the drop. Despite victory in the FA Trophy, York City took the last spot on the final day of the campaign, suffering the embarrassment of a second successive relegation and becoming the first club to suffer back-to-back relegations from the Football League to the sixth tier; whilst their form between January and April gave them a good chance of survival, an awful first half of the season ultimately proved to be costly for their hopes, as did a staggering five results all going against them on the final day of the season.

League play-offs

Football League play-offs

EFL Championship

Final

EFL League One

Final

EFL League Two

Final

National League play-offs

National League

Final

National League North

Final

National League South

Final

Cup competitions

FA Cup

Final

EFL Cup

Final

Community Shield

EFL Trophy

Final

FA Trophy

Final

Women's Football

League season

Women's Super League

Women's Super League 1

Women's Super League 2

FA WSL Spring Series

WSL Spring Series League 1

WSL Spring Series League 2

Cup competitions

FA Women's Cup

Final

FA WSL Cup

Final
Manchester City won their second cup after 2014 and completed the double.

Managerial changes 
This is a list of changes of managers within English league football:

Diary of the season
 13 August: The new Premier League season starts with newly promoted Hull City beating champions Leicester City 2–1 at the KCOM Stadium. Pep Guardiola wins his first match as Manchester City manager, 2–1 against Sunderland.
 14 August: José Mourinho wins his first game as manager of Manchester United 3–1 against AFC Bournemouth at Dean Court. Arsenal are beaten 4–3 by Liverpool at the Emirates Stadium.
 15 August: Antonio Conte wins his first match as Chelsea manager 2–1 against West Ham United at Stamford Bridge.
 31 August: The first month of the new season ends with Manchester City, Chelsea, and Manchester United – all under new management – joint top with three wins out of three. Newly promoted Hull City and Middlesbrough have made promising starts on their return to the top flight and stand in fifth and sixth respectively, bookended by Everton and Tottenham Hotspur. Watford (18th), AFC Bournemouth and Stoke City are joint bottom with one point apiece, with Sunderland and Crystal Palace also with one point but less goals conceded. After five matches, the EFL Championship is led by Huddersfield Town and Fulham, both of whom struggled last season. Newly promoted Barnsley lead the play-off pack – Newcastle United, Queens Park Rangers and Bristol City – thanks to good goal-scoring form that sees them as the English Football League's second highest scoring side. Blackburn Rovers sit in last place with one point, joined in the relegation zone by Preston North End and Rotherham United; Wigan Athletic and Leeds United stay out of the drop zone on goal difference.
 27 September: Sam Allardyce is forced to step down as England manager after less than three months, following his recording by undercover journalists from The Daily Telegraph of him offering his services as a speaker for £400,000, insulting previous England manager Roy Hodgson, and criticising and suggesting ways around The Football Association's ban on third-party ownership of players. Under-21 coach Gareth Southgate is announced as interim manager of the team.
 30 September: Manchester City stand top of the Premier League, having won their first six games, with a four-point gap between them and Spurs and Everton. Arsenal and Liverpool stand joint fourth, with Manchester United and Crystal Palace not far behind. Sunderland drop to last place, with Stoke still in the relegation zone and West Ham now joining them after a poor run of form. Huddersfield continue to lead the Championship, with Norwich City now in second. Newcastle and Bristol City remain in the top six, now sandwiching Brighton & Hove Albion and Brentford, with Birmingham City, Sheffield Wednesday and Reading out of the top six due to goal difference. Rotherham are now bottom of the Championship, with Cardiff City and Blackburn two points ahead of the Millers and Wigan Athletic's superior goal difference keeping them out of the bottom three.
 23 October: Manchester City draw 1–1 with Southampton at the City of Manchester Stadium. Their city rivals, United, are smashed 4–0 by manager José Mourinho's former club Chelsea at Stamford Bridge. The result is Mourinho's heaviest Premier League defeat, United's worst away loss since October 1999 (when they also lost to the same club by over four goals after they were hit for five), and the first time they were beaten by four goals or more in a match since losing to West Ham in the League Cup in November 2010.
 31 October: Manchester City maintain the lead in the Premier League, but a run of one win in their four games this month means that they are only separated from Arsenal and Liverpool by goal difference. A resurgent Chelsea have leapfrogged a still unbeaten Spurs into the last UEFA Champions League spot, while Everton, Watford, and Manchester United are some way off the top four. Sunderland have only won 2 points from their opening 10 games, beating Manchester City's record for the worst-ever start to a Premier League season, and remain stuck to the bottom of the table. Swansea City and Hull have now dropped into the relegation zone, with Middlesbrough, West Bromwich Albion, and West Ham now with a three-point buffer from 18th. In the Championship, poor October form from Huddersfield and Norwich (culminating in 5–0 away thrashings to Fulham and Brighton respectively in their last games of the month) have seen them drop to third and fourth, with Newcastle holding a three-point lead over Brighton at the top of the table. Reading have climbed to fifth; Bristol City hold on to sixth place, but with Birmingham and Sheffield Wednesday still breathing down their necks. Rotherham are still bottom and eight points from safety, and Blackburn remains 23rd. A managerial change for Cardiff – with Neil Warnock replacing Paul Trollope – has seen the Bluebirds rise to 21st, but despite Wigan also sacking their manager they are now in the bottom three.
 1 November: Arsenal become the first English side to progress to the Champions League knockout rounds this season after defeating Ludogorets Razgrad 3–2.
 22 November: Leicester City secure passage to the knockout rounds of the Champions League by defeating Club Brugge 2–1. Tottenham Hotspur are not so lucky, however, and are eliminated after a 2–1 defeat to Monaco, leaving them needing to avoid defeat at CSKA Moscow in their final match in order to even get the consolation prize of transferring into the UEFA Europa League.
 23 November: Manchester City confirm qualification for the Champions League knockout rounds after holding Borussia Mönchengladbach to a 1–1 draw.
 30 November: Chelsea are now heading up what has become a very competitive title race, a single point ahead of Liverpool, who in turn are ahead of Manchester City by just one goal. Arsenal are two points behind City, and have a four-point cushion over rivals Tottenham Hotspur. Sunderland, Swansea and Hull still make up the relegation places, but a major improvement in form for Sunderland has left them bottom by just one point, and only three points off safety. Newcastle United and Brighton continue to lead the way in the Championship, six points and four points respectively ahead of third-placed Reading. Birmingham City and Leeds United have now entered the play-off spots, with Huddersfield just hanging on. At the bottom of the table, Rotherham United are eleven points adrift and already looking for their third manager of the season following the shock resignation of Kenny Jackett. Cardiff City have dropped back into the relegation zone on goal difference, with Wigan Athletic remaining there. Wolves are only outside the relegation spots on goal difference, with Blackburn Rovers and second-tier newcomers Burton Albion just a further point ahead. Gareth Southgate is confirmed as the next England manager.
 7 December: Tottenham Hotspur manage to stay in Europe by beating CSKA Moscow, meaning that they will finish third in their Champions League group and therefore progress into the knockout rounds of the Europa League.
 8 December: Manchester United secure passage to the Europa League's knockout rounds with a 2–0 victory over Zorya Luhansk, but Southampton's failure to beat Hapoel Be'er Sheva sees them eliminated.
 23 December: Sam Allardyce makes his return to football after just under three months, taking over at Premier League strugglers Crystal Palace, who sacked Alan Pardew a day beforehand.
 31 December: 2016 ends with Chelsea having broken clear of the chasing pack, now six points ahead of Liverpool. Manchester City are four points behind Liverpool after a 1–0 loss at Anfield earlier in the day, and Arsenal are two points behind City with a game in hand. Tottenham Hotspur remain fifth, a point behind Arsenal, and also with a game in hand over City. Swansea City have now fallen to the foot of the table and are looking for their third manager of the season following Bob Bradley's abortive reign in charge of the Welsh club, with Hull City just a point ahead of them. Sunderland's continued improvement has brought them up to third-bottom, though they're two points behind Crystal Palace having played a game more. Newcastle United and Brighton are now well clear at the top of the Championship, with Reading heading up an extremely competitive play-off race, followed by Huddersfield Town, Leeds United and Sheffield Wednesday, with a resurgent Derby County only a point behind Wednesday. Despite a recent improvement, Rotherham United remain deep in trouble at the bottom of the table eleven points off safety. Wigan Athletic have fallen further into the mire, five points off safety, and Blackburn Rovers have fallen back into the relegation zone, three points behind a Cardiff City side who have a game in hand.
 7 January: The third round of the FA Cup sees three Premier League sides fall to lower-league opposition, with Bournemouth being eliminated by EFL League One side Millwall and Stoke City and West Bromwich Albion falling to Championship teams Wolverhampton Wanderers and Derby County. National League side Lincoln City also manage to force a replay against Championship side Ipswich Town.
 12 January: Former England manager Graham Taylor dies of a heart attack, at the age of 72.
 17 January: The FA Cup third round replays result in two notable upsets, with National League leaders Lincoln City knocking out Ipswich Town, and fellow National Leaguers Sutton United knocking out AFC Wimbledon, setting up a fourth round tie with Championship high-fliers Leeds United.
 28 January: The fourth round of the FA Cup sees National League leaders Lincoln City upset the odds again by dumping Championship leaders Brighton & Hove Albion out 3–1, becoming the eighth post-War non-League club to reach the fifth round. Liverpool also fall to Championship side Wolverhampton Wanderers, while Newcastle United, who are second in the Championship, are eliminated by League One outfit Oxford United. Tottenham Hotspur also come perilously close to being knocked out by Wycombe Wanderers of EFL League Two, needing two goals in the final five minutes of their match to secure passage to the next round.
 29 January: The lowest ranked side still left in the FA Cup Sutton United join Lincoln City in the fifth round by beating Leeds United 1–0, becoming the ninth post-War non-League club to reach the fifth round and ensuring that 2 non league sides reach the last 16 of the competition for the first time since the current incarnation of the F.A. Cup came into existence.
 31 January: Although Chelsea's winning streak has been broken by Tottenham and Liverpool, their lead at the top of the table has extended to nine points. Spurs are up to second, ahead of Arsenal on goal difference. A poor run of form has seen Liverpool fall to fourth, but they are the only team in the European hunt without the distraction of domestic and European cups for the rest of the season. Manchester City, Manchester United and Everton complete the top seven (all three holding a game in hand each). Swansea's form has improved under Paul Clement and they now stand in 17th, level on points with Middlesbrough and Leicester. Crystal Palace have fallen into the relegation zone, while Hull and Sunderland are five points adrift of Swansea. Brighton are two points ahead of Newcastle in the Championship; Reading are three points behind Newcastle, but have played two games more. Leeds and Huddersfield exchange fourth and fifth position, while Derby is now in the top six on goal difference. The relegation zone is unchanged, but Blackburn and Wigan are now three points behind Bristol City and Burton, the latter two teams having played a game more each.
 18 February: National League leaders Lincoln City make history by becoming the first non-league side to reach the quarter finals of the FA Cup since 1912.
 20 February: Sutton United finally bow out of the F.A. Cup, losing 2–0 to eventual cup winners Arsenal.
 23 February: Claudio Ranieri is sacked as Leicester City manager less than a year after their shock title victory, with the club still in the Champions League, but just one point outside the relegation places. Later that night, Tottenham Hotspur are eliminated from the Europa League after only managing to draw 2–2 against Gent, resulting in their elimination by 3–2 on aggregate.
 25 February: The East Anglian derby between Ipswich and Norwich finishes 1–1, while in League One Connor Ripley's two penalty saves–in the 90th and 95th minutes–are enough for relegation-threatened Oldham Athletic to hold Millwall to a goalless draw.
 26 February: Manchester United win the first silverware of the domestic season, defeating Southampton 3–2 with a late goal by Zlatan Ibrahimović.
 28 February: With 12 games left in the season, it appears that the title is Chelsea's to lose, as they stand ten points clear of second-place Spurs. Manchester City have jumped to third and Arsenal remain in fourth. Liverpool's poor run of form in 2017 sees them finish February in fifth, with Manchester United still in sixth but with a game in hand. Everton remain seventh – depending on the winner of the FA Cup (Liverpool being the only top six team eliminated thus far), England's last Europa League spot may go to the Merseysiders or to West Bromwich Albion, only eight points behind. The relegation zone remains the same as it was in January, but the relegation battle continues to heat up as only three points separate Middlesbrough (17th) from Sunderland (20th). Things look rosier for Sunderland's rivals Newcastle, who now hold the two-point lead over Brighton at the top of the Championship and are eight clear of third-placed Huddersfield having played a game more. Leeds remain fourth, Reading fall to fifth, and Sheffield Wednesday climb to sixth. The Championship relegation zone remains unchanged for the second month running.
 7 March: Arsenal suffer a thumping Champions League exit after being beaten 5–1 by Bayern Munich for the second match in succession, resulting in a 10–2 loss on aggregate. While manager Arsène Wenger blames the loss on the dismissal of Laurent Koscielny early in the second half, the heavy nature of the loss leads to increasing speculation over Wenger's future at the club.
 11 March: Josh Wright scores a nine-minute hat-trick of penalties for Gillingham against former club Scunthorpe United in League One.
 14 March: Leicester City progress to the quarter-finals of the Champions League, defeating Sevilla 2–0 at the King Power Stadium and winning 3–2 on aggregate, with a late penalty save from Kasper Schmeichel ultimately proving critical.
 15 March: Manchester City suffer elimination from the Champions League, after conceding a late goal in a 3–1 loss to Monaco, resulting in them losing via away goals after a 6–6 aggregate scoreline. This also makes City the second English team eliminated by Monaco this season (after they knocked out Tottenham Hotspur in the group stages), and leaves Leicester City as the only English club still in the competition.
 16 March: Gareth Southgate names four uncapped players – Burnley's Michael Keane, Michail Antonio of West Ham, and Southampton pair Nathan Redmond and James Ward-Prowse – to his England squad to face Germany and Lithuania, while also included after long breaks are Jake Livermore and Jermain Defoe, who were last capped in 2012 and 2013 respectively.
 17 March: Acquaintances renewed for the surviving English clubs in Europe as the draws pair Champions League Leicester with their 1997–98 UEFA Cup conquerors Atlético Madrid, and Europa Leaguers Manchester United with 2000–01 UEFA Champions League opposition Anderlecht.
 31 March: Chelsea continue to lead the way in the Premier League, and hold an increasingly unassailable-looking ten point lead over nearest challengers Tottenham Hotspur. Manchester City and Liverpool are two points and three points respectively behind Spurs, and a further four points separates Liverpool from Manchester United, who have finally moved off sixth place at the expense of Arsenal. Sunderland remain bottom, with Middlesbrough now having dropped into the relegation zone, behind Hull City. Newcastle United continue to lead the way in the Championship, four points ahead of Brighton & Hove Albion. A stutter for the south coast side has seen Huddersfield Town close to within three points of them, with Leeds United, Reading and Sheffield Wednesday continuing to make up the play-off spots. At the other end of the table, Rotherham United are all but doomed to relegation, as they need to win all of their remaining games while making up a 40-goal deficit to survive. Wigan Athletic look increasingly likely to join them, and are seven points off safety. Blackburn Rovers remain in the relegation zone, but are now just one point behind the three sides above them.
 1 April: Rotherham United become the first league side to be relegated this year, as a defeat to Fulham puts survival beyond reach for the side.
 8 April: Sheffield United and Doncaster Rovers win promotion from League One and League Two respectively, becoming the first league sides to be promoted this season. Rovers had only been relegated from League One the previous year, while United end a six-year absence from the Championship.
 14 April: Coventry City are relegated to League Two after failing to beat Charlton Athletic, in a match marked (and briefly held up) by repeated protests by the fans of both clubs against their respective owners. Chesterfield, the side above Coventry, are also effectively consigned to relegation after a defeat by Southend United, with the Spireites left needing to win all their remaining games while making up a deficit of 17 goals. In the National League, former League club Southport are relegated to the sixth tier of English football as the Sandgrounders' failure to beat Dover Athletic seals their fate with three matches remaining.
 15 April: Sheffield United become the first divisional champions of the season without kicking a ball, as Bolton Wanderers' failure to defeat Oldham Athletic seals the League One title for the Blades.
 17 April: Plymouth Argyle and Portsmouth are promoted to League One for the first time since 2011 and 2013 respectively. Chesterfield are relegated to League Two after losing 3–1 to Scunthorpe United at Glanford Park. Later that day, Brighton & Hove Albion secure a return to the top-flight since 1983 after beating Wigan Athletic and following Huddersfield Town's televised failure to defeat Derby County. That result also clinches promotion for the south coast side, with closest rivals Newcastle United needing to win all three of their remaining games to overtake them.
 18 April: Leicester City, the last remaining English side in the Champions League, are eliminated 2–1 on aggregate by Atletico Madrid, after only being able to draw 1–1 at home with the Spanish side.
 20 April: Manchester United progress to the semi-finals of the Europa League after defeating Anderlecht with a goal in extra-time at Old Trafford, marking the first occasion they have progressed so far in the competition.
 21 April: With Brighton & Hove Albion needing a win at Norwich City to seal the Championship title, goalkeeper David Stockdale scores two freakish own goals that delays the club from clinching said title for a little while yet.
 22 April: Financially stricken Leyton Orient are relegated from the Football League for the first time in their history, after losing to fellow strugglers Crewe Alexandra. Coming in the other direction are Lincoln City, whose victory over Macclesfield Town secures them promotion back to the Football League after a six-year absence.
 25 April: Huddersfield Town secure their place in the 2017 Football League play-offs with victory over Wolves.
 26 April: Burnley midfielder Joey Barton receives an 18-month suspension after admitting betting offences; the player has appealed against the length of the sentence, handed down in response to "over 1,200" football bets.
 27 April: The Thursday night Manchester derby at the City of Manchester Stadium finishes goalless, and the away side have Marouane Fellaini sent-off.
 28 April: Tottenham Hotspur announce that after moving from White Hart Lane next month, they will play their home matches next season at Wembley Stadium, after which they will move to the new Northumberland Development Project, built on the existing stadium site.
 29 April: York City, a League side from 1930 to 2004 and 2012 to 2016, are relegated for the second successive season, becoming the first-ever side to be relegated from the Football League and then fifth tier in successive seasons. Later that day, Sunderland are relegated from the Premier League for the first time since 2006 after losing 1–0 to AFC Bournemouth at the Stadium of Light and Wigan Athletic suffer an immediate relegation back to League One after losing 1–0 to Reading at the Madejski Stadium. Leyton Orient's final home game of the season is delayed by two hours and ultimately finished behind closed doors, after fans of the already-relegated side invade the pitch to protest against owner Francesco Becchetti's management of the club.
 30 April: Bolton Wanderers return to the Championship after just one season, following a 3–0 victory against Peterborough United at the Macron Stadium. At the other end of the League One table, Port Vale are relegated after a goalless draw at Fleetwood Town, with Fleetwood joining Scunthorpe United, Bradford City and Millwall in the Play Offs.
 5 May: Second-placed Tottenham are beaten 1–0 by West Ham at the Olympic Stadium they had once hoped to inhabit, missing the opportunity to reduce Chelsea's lead at the top of the Premier League to one point; a result that was described by NBC Sports as "the night Tottenham's latest title bid ended".
 8 May: Middlesbrough are relegated to Championship following their 3–0 away loss against Chelsea, who now need a victory from their next fixture to win the Premier League.
 12 May: Chelsea are crowned the champions of Premier League after their 1–0 away win over West Bromwich Albion. The winning goal was scored by Michy Batshuayi.
 14 May: Hull City became the final team to be relegated from the Premier League after getting thrashed 4–0 away by Crystal Palace, who by the virtue of this victory have secured their own top-flight status for the next season. This result also ensures the safety of Swansea City, who have defeated 2–0 Sunderland at the Stadium of Light the day before.

Deaths

 6 June 2016: Harry Gregory, 72, Leyton Orient, Charlton Athletic, Aston Villa and Hereford United midfielder, Nicky Jennings, 70, Plymouth Argyle, Portsmouth and Exeter City winger.
 7 June 2016: Johnny Brooks, 84, Reading, Tottenham Hotspur, Chelsea and Brentford inside forward.
 10 June 2016: Alex Govan, 86, Plymouth Argyle, Birmingham City and Portsmouth outside left.
 13 June 2016: Tony Byrne, 70, Republic of Ireland, Millwall, Southampton, Hereford United and Newport County left back.
 20 June 2016: Eamonn Dolan, 48, West Ham United, Birmingham City and Exeter City striker, who also managed Exeter and was Reading academy manager at the time of his death.
 21 June 2016: Bryan Edwards, 85, Bolton Wanderers wing half, who also managed Bradford City.
 3 July 2016: Jimmy Frizzell, 79, Oldham Athletic utility player, who also had spells in management at Oldham and Manchester City, John Middleton, 59, Nottingham Forest and Derby County goalkeeper.
 7 July 2016: John O'Rourke, 71, Luton Town, Middlesbrough, Ipswich Town, Coventry City, Queens Park Rangers and A.F.C. Bournemouth forward.
 9 July 2016: Ray Spencer, 82, Darlington and Torquay United wing half.
 10 July 2016: David Stride, 58, Chelsea, Millwall and Leyton Orient defender.
 13 July 2016: George Allen, 84, Birmingham City and Torquay United left back.
 18 July 2016: John Hope, 67, Darlington, Newcastle United, Sheffield United and Hartlepool United goalkeeper.
 c.20 July 2016: Bill Park, 97, Blackpool and York City centre half, Tom McCready, 72, Watford and Wimbledon left back.
 28 July 2016: Dave Syrett, 60, Swindon Town, Mansfield Town, Walsall, Peterborough United and Northampton Town forward.
 2 August 2016: Neil Wilkinson, 61, Blackburn Rovers, Port Vale and Crewe Alexandra right back.
 3 August 2016: Russell Coughlin, 56, Blackburn Rovers, Carlisle United, Plymouth Argyle, Blackpool, Swansea City, Exeter City and Torquay United midfielder.
 5 August 2016: Joe Davis, 75, Carlisle United left back.
 6 August 2016: Mel Slack, 72, Sunderland, Southend United and Cambridge United midfielder.
 7 August 2016: Roy Summersby, 81, Millwall, Crystal Palace and Portsmouth inside forward.
 13 August 2016: Liam Tuohy, 83, Republic of Ireland and Newcastle United outside left.
 15 August 2016: Dalian Atkinson, 48, Ipswich Town, Sheffield Wednesday, Aston Villa and Manchester City striker.
 27 August 2016: Ronnie Cope, 81, Manchester United and Luton Town centre half.
 29 August 2016: Reg Matthewson, 77, Sheffield United, Fulham and Chester defender.
 30 August 2016: Dave Durie, 85, Blackpool and Chester City inside forward.
 5 September 2016: Max Murray, 80, West Bromwich Albion striker.
 6 September 2016: Bert Llewellyn, 77, Everton, Crewe Alexandra, Port Vale, Northampton Town, Walsall and Wigan Athletic centre-forward, Dave Pacey, 79, Luton Town midfielder.
 7 September 2016: Alan Smith, 77, Torquay United centre half.
 13 September 2016: Denis Atkins, 77, Huddersfield Town and Bradford City full back, Matt Gray, 80, Manchester City forward.
 24 September 2016: Mel Charles, 81, Wales, Swansea City, Arsenal, Cardiff City and Port Vale utility player.
 26 September 2016: Jackie Sewell, 89, England, Zambia, Notts County, Sheffield Wednesday, Aston Villa and Hull City forward.
 28 September 2016: Seamus Dunne, 86, Ireland and Luton Town defender, Graham Hawkins, 70, Wolverhampton Wanderers, Preston North End, Blackburn Rovers and Port Vale defender, who also managed Wolves for two years.
 1 October 2016: David Herd, 82, Scotland, Stockport County, Arsenal, Manchester United and Stoke City forward, who also managed Lincoln City.
 4 October 2016: Merfyn Jones, 85, Liverpool, Scunthorpe United, Crewe Alexandra, Chester City and Lincoln City winger.
 7 October 2016: Peter Denton, 70, Coventry City and Luton Town winger.
 10 October 2016: Gerry Gow, 64, Bristol City, Manchester City, Rotherham United and Burnley midfielder.
 16 October 2016: Eddie O'Hara, 80, Everton, Rotherham United and Barnsley winger.
 18 October 2016: Gary Sprake, 71. Wales, Leeds United and Birmingham City goalkeeper.
 19 October 2016: Sammy Smyth, 91, Northern Ireland, Wolverhampton Wanderers, Stoke City and Liverpool striker.
 21 October 2016: Roy Jennings, 84, Brighton & Hove Albion centre half.
 27 October 2016: Brian Hill, 75, Coventry City and Torquay United defender.
 2 November 2016: Ray Mabbutt, 80, Bristol Rovers and Newport County midfielder.
 6 November 2016: Mick Granger, 85, York City, Hull City and Halifax Town goalkeeper.
 7 November 2016: Thomas Gardner, 93, Everton forward.
 15 November 2016: Ray Brady, 79, Republic of Ireland, Millwall and Queens Park Rangers defender, Bobby Campbell, 60, Northern Ireland, Aston Villa, Huddersfield Town, Sheffield United, Halifax Town, Bradford City, Derby County and Wigan Athletic striker.
 16 November 2016: Len Allchurch, 83, Wales, Swansea City, Sheffield United and Stockport County winger.
 24 November 2016: Paul Futcher, 60, Chester City, Luton Town, Manchester City, Oldham Athletic, Derby County, Barnsley, Halifax Town F.C. and Grimsby Town defender, who also managed Darlington.
 26 November 2016: David Provan, 75, Scotland, Crystal Palace and Plymouth Argyle defender.
 29 November 2016: Norman Oakley, 77, Hartlepool United, Swindon Town and Grimsby Town goalkeeper.
 November 2016: Brian Bulless, 83, Hull City wing half.
 December 2016: Ian Cartwright, 52, Wolverhampton Wanderers midfielder.
 10 December 2016: Peter Brabrook, 79, England, Chelsea, West Ham United and Leyton Orient winger, Barrie Hillier, 80, Southampton full back.
 11 December 2016: Sid O'Linn, 89, South Africa and Charlton Athletic inside forward.
 15 December 2016: Albert Bennett, 72, Rotherham United, Newcastle United and Norwich City forward.
 29 December 2016: Norman Rimmington, 93, Barnsley and Hartlepool United, goalkeeper, Matt Carragher, 40, Wigan Athletic, Port Vale and Macclesfield Town defender.
 4 January 2017: Paul Went, 67, Leyton Orient, Charlton Athletic, Fulham, Portsmouth and Cardiff City centre half who also had a short spell in management with Orient.
 5 January 2017: Graham Atkinson, 73, all-time top goalscorer at Oxford United, Harry Taylor, 81, Newcastle United outside right.
 11 January 2017: François Van der Elst, 62, Belgium and West Ham United winger.
 12 January 2017: Graham Taylor, 72, former England manager. Also enjoyed success during two spells as manager of both Watford and Aston Villa. Also managed Lincoln City and Wolverhampton Wanderers. Played for Grimsby Town and Lincoln City before moving into management.
 16 January 2017: Brian Whitehouse, 81, West Bromwich Albion, Norwich City, Wrexham, Crystal Palace, Charlton Athletic and Leyton Orient forward.
 18 January 2017: Robin Hardy, 75, Cambridge United wing half.
 21 January 2017: Dave Shipperley, 64, Charlton Athletic, Gillingham and Reading centre back.
 27 January 2017: Billy Simpson, 87, Northern Ireland and Oxford United centre forward.
 12 February 2017: Bobby Murdoch, 81, Liverpool, Barrow, Stockport County, Carlisle United and Southport inside forward.
 15 February 2017: Roy Proverbs, 84, Coventry City and Gillingham defender.
 19 February 2017: Roger Hynd, 75, Crystal Palace, Birmingham City and Walsall centre half, Paul McCarthy, 45, Brighton & Hove Albion, Wycombe Wanderers and Oxford United centre half.
 25 February 2017: Bobby Lumley, 84, Charlton Athletic, Hartlepool United, Chesterfield and Gateshead inside right.
 27 February 2017: Alex Young, 80, Scotland, Everton and Stockport County striker.
 2 March 2017: Tommy Gemmell, 73, Scotland and Nottingham Forest left back.
 13 March 2017: Dave Taylor, 76, Gillingham and Portsmouth inside forward.
 14 March 2017: Jim McAnearney, 81, Sheffield Wednesday, Plymouth Argyle, Watford and Bradford City inside forward, who also managed Bradford and Rotherham United,
 22 March 2017: Ronnie Moran, 81, Liverpool left back, who spent from 1966 to 1998 as a coach as part of Liverpool's famous Boot Room.
 28 March 2017: Paul Bowles, 59, Crewe Alexandra, Port Vale and Stockport County defender.
 March 2017: Billy Hails, 82, Lincoln City, Peterborough United, Northampton Town and Luton Town winger.
 c.1 April 2017: John Phillips, 65, Wales, Shrewsbury Town, Aston Villa, Chelsea, Brighton & Hove Albion and Charlton Athletic goalkeeper.
 6 April 2017: Stan Anslow, 85, Millwall full back.
 10 April 2017: Fred Furniss, 94, Sheffield United full back.
 21 April 2017: Ugo Ehiogu, 44, England, West Bromwich Albion, Aston Villa, Middlesbrough and Sheffield United centre half, who was coaching at Tottenham Hotspur at the time of his death.
 1 May 2017: Roy Gater, 76, Port Vale, Bournemouth & Boscombe Athletic, Crewe Alexandra half-back.
 2 May 2017: Cammy Duncan, 51, Sunderland goalkeeper.
 6 May 2017: Tony Conwell, 85, Sheffield Wednesday, Huddersfield Town, Derby County and Doncaster Rovers right back, Peter Noble, 72, Newcastle United, Swindon Town, Burnley and Blackpool forward.
 19 May 2017: Corbett Cresswell, 84, Carlisle United centre half, Tommy Ross, 71, Peterborough United and York City inside forward, known for having scored the fastest ever hat-trick, Alan Williams, 78, Bristol City, Oldham Athletic, Watford, Newport County and Swansea Town centre-half.
 20 May 2017: Noel Kinsey, 91, Wales, Norwich City, Birmingham City and Port Vale  inside right.

Retirements 

 9 June 2016: Daniel Agger, 31, former Denmark and Liverpool defender.
 21 June 2016: Andrew Procter, 33, former Accrington Stanley, Preston North End and Bury midfielder.
 3 July 2016: Mikel Arteta, 34, former Everton and Arsenal midfielder.
 13 July 2016: Kelvin Davis, 39, former Luton Town, Wimbledon, Ipswich Town, Sunderland and Southampton goalkeeper.
 26 July 2016: Gregor Robertson, 32, former Nottingham Forest, Rotherham United, Chesterfield, Crewe Alexandra and Northampton Town defender.
 1 August 2016: Andy Reid, 34, former Republic of Ireland, Nottingham Forest, Tottenham Hotspur, Charlton Athletic, Sunderland and Blackpool midfielder.
 8 August 2016: Brede Hangeland, 35, former Norway, Fulham and Crystal Palace defender.
 14 August 2016: Jonathan Woodgate, 36, former England, Leeds United, Newcastle United, Middlesbrough, Tottenham Hotspur and Stoke City defender.
 22 August 2016: Danny Boshell, 35, former Oldham Athletic, Stockport County, Grimsby Town, Chesterfield, Altrincham and Guiseley midfielder.
 31 August 2016: Dani Osvaldo, 30, former Italy and Southampton striker.
 2 September 2016: Antony Sweeney, 32, former Hartlepool United, Carlisle United and Gateshead midfielder.
 18 September 2016: Jérémy Hélan, 24, former Manchester City, Carlisle United, Shrewsbury Town, Wolverhampton Wanderers and Sheffield Wednesday midfielder.
 23 October 2016: Stephen McPhail, 36, former Republic of Ireland, Leeds United, Barnsley, Cardiff City and Sheffield Wednesday midfielder.
 1 November 2016: Joe Gormley, 26, former Peterborough United striker.
 16 November 2016: Sam Ricketts, 35, former Wales, Oxford United, Swansea City, Hull City, Bolton Wanderers, Wolverhampton Wanderers and Coventry City defender.
 24 November 2016: Steven Gerrard, 36, former England and Liverpool midfielder, who played over 700 games for the Reds, many as captain.
 9 December 2016: Bobby Zamora, 35, former England, Bristol Rovers, Brighton & Hove Albion, Tottenham Hotspur, West Ham United, Fulham and Queens Park Rangers striker.
 18 December 2016: Alex, 34, former Brazil and Chelsea defender.
 December 2016: Rob Jones, 37, former Stockport County, Grimsby Town, Scunthorpe United, Sheffield Wednesday, Doncaster Rovers and Hartlepool United defender.
 January 2017: Enzo Maresca, 36, former West Bromwich Albion midfielder
 2 February 2017: Frank Lampard, 38, former England, West Ham United, Chelsea and Manchester City midfielder.
 1 March 2017: Stephen Wright, 37, former Liverpool, Sunderland, Coventry City, Brentford and Hartlepool United full back.
 24 April 2017: Alan Goodall, 35, former Rochdale, Luton Town, Chesterfield, Fleetwood Town, Morecambe and Grimsby Town defender.
 1 May 2017: Lee Mansell, 34, former Luton Town, Oxford United, Torquay United and Bristol Rovers midfielder.
 9 May 2017: Darren Jones, 33, former Bristol City, Hereford United, Aldershot Town, Shrewsbury Town, A.F.C. Wimbledon and Newport County defender.
 17 May 2017: Dirk Kuyt, 36, former Netherlands and Liverpool forward.
 18 May 2017: Steve Mildenhall, 38, former Swindon Town, Notts County, Oldham Athletic, Grimsby Town, Yeovil Town, Southend United, Millwall and Bristol Rovers goalkeeper.
 19 May 2017: Peter Murphy, 27, former Accrington Stanley, Wycombe Wanderers and Morecambe defensive midfielder.
 20 May 2017: Xabi Alonso, 35, former Spain and Liverpool midfielder.
 25 May 2017: Alex Manninger, 39, former Austria and Arsenal goalkeeper.

References